Robert Atherton (1861–1930) was an English poet.

Robert Atherton may also refer to:

 Robert Atherton (1876–1917), Welsh footballer 
 Robert Crossley Atherton (1908–1986), American author, publisher, and businessman

See also
 Robert Atherton Edwin (1839–1911), New Zealand meteorologist 
 Robert Atherton Rawstorne (1824–1902) was Archdeacon of Blackburn from 1885 until 1899
 Robert Vernon Atherton Gwillym (1741–1783), British country landowner and politician